Fulbright University Vietnam (FUV) is a private nonprofit university currently located at the Crescent Plaza in Phú Mỹ Hưng (with a future campus in the Saigon Hi-Tech Park) in Hồ Chí Minh City, Vietnam. It is one of Vietnam's first private, nonprofit institutions of higher education. The FUV concept emerged from discussions convened by the Vietnam Program at the Harvard Kennedy School aimed at planning the next stage in the development of the Fulbright Economics Teaching Program (FETP), a center of public policy research and teaching in Hồ Chí Minh City.

Since 2014, the university's development has been coordinated by the Trust for University Innovation in Vietnam (TUIV), a nonprofit corporation based in the Boston area. TUIV and the Harvard Vietnam Program are recipients of several grants from the Bureau of Educational and Cultural Affairs of the United States Department of State.

History
A license to establish the Fulbright University Vietnam was presented to the Board of the Trust for University Innovation by Nguyễn Phú Trọng in 2015. The campaign for licensing and funding was spearheaded by Thomas Vallely of the Ash Center for Democratic Governance and Innovation at the Harvard Kennedy School. Vallely said the university will “will embody American values including academic freedom, autonomy, meritocracy, and transparency.”

Although Fulbright University Vietnam is a private university, it has benefited from the support of the governments of both Vietnam and the United States. In the United States, Fulbright University Vietnam, and its antecedent, the Fulbright Economics Teaching Program, has benefited from strong bilateral support in Congress. Of particular note is the role played by John Kerry. While in the Senate, Kerry and his fellow Vietnam veteran John McCain were strong supporters of education exchange with Vietnam. As Secretary of State, Kerry was an early advocate for the FUV initiative.

In 2013, FUV was cited in a joint statement by President Trương Tấn Sang and President Barack Obama during President Sang's visit to the United States. In June 2014, Prime Minister Nguyễn Tấn Dũng approved the establishment of FUV. In December 2014, the United States Congress approved $20 million to fund the development of FUV on the condition that the university be independent, not-for-profit, and on par with the quality of American universities.

The government of Vietnam officially licensed FUV on May 16, 2016. Later that month, the launch of Fulbright University Vietnam was officially announced in a speech by President Barack Obama in Hanoi. Two days later in Ho Chi Minh City, at a ceremony witnessed by Secretary of State John Kerry, Fulbright University VIetnam was awarded its establishment license.

Academics
During its first five years, FUV will focus on the development of two integrated academic units, a graduate school of public policy and management and an undergraduate program in engineering and the liberal arts and sciences.

The Fulbright School of Public Policy and Management represents the continuation and expansion of the Fulbright Economics Teaching Program, the center of public policy teaching and research operated by the Harvard Kennedy School Vietnam Program from 1994 to 2016. The public policy school will offer degree and non-degree programs in public policy and related fields.

FUV's undergraduate program in engineering and the liberal arts and sciences admitted a beta class in 2018 and underwent a year-long co-design process to build all aspects of the university collaboratively with the involvement of faculty, staff, and students. The academic program is being developed in consultation with faculty members from the Olin College of Engineering. The undergraduate program will feature interdisciplinary courses, project-based learning, and active engagement with the community.

FUV intends to seek accreditation from a U.S. regional accrediting body. FUV may enroll up to 2,000 students during its first five years.

Campus 
FUV plans to build its main campus in the Saigon Hi-Tech Park in District 9. The government of Hồ Chí Minh City has contributed 15 hectares of land in the park to FUV, where FUV will build learning and residential facilities.

The Bob Kerrey Controversy

In May 2016 during his visit to Vietnam, then Secretary of State John Kerry announced that the Americans had appointed Bob Kerrey to be chairman of the Board of Trustees of Fulbright University Vietnam. This gave rise to controversy. In 2001 an in-depth investigation by The New York Times and CBS News had revealed that on 25 February 1969 Bob Kerrey had commanded a Navy SEALS unit that massacred 21 civilians in Thạnh Phong village in the Vietnam War.

Among the prominent Vietnamese critics of the appointment of Kerrey were Tôn Nữ Thị Ninh, a former ambassador to the European Union, and Nguyễn Thanh Việt, an award-winning Vietnamese-American writer. The most high-ranking Vietnamese official to publicly support Kerrey's appointment was Đinh La Thăng, who at the time was Communist Party Secretary of Hồ Chí Minh City and a member of the Politburo.

In May 2018, H. Kim Bottomly, former president of Wellesley College, was appointed as the chair of the board of the trustees. In June 2019, Dr. Bottomly stepped down amidst a Board reorganization that gave TUIV, chaired by Mr. Thomas Vallely, oversight responsibility for the university.

References

External links
 Fulbright University Vietnam

United States–Vietnam relations
Universities in Ho Chi Minh City
2016 establishments in Vietnam
Educational institutions established in 2016
United States Department of State
Bureau of Educational and Cultural Affairs